Rachel Leah Jones (born 1970) is an American-Israeli documentary film director and producer. Her documentary film Advocate about the controversial human rights lawyer Leah Tsemel, which she co-directed and co-produced with cinematographer Philippe Bellaïche, premiered at 2019 Sundance Film Festival, and won top prizes at Kraków Film Festival, Thessaloniki Documentary Festival and Docaviv Festival.

Early life and education 
Jones was born in Berkeley, California and raised in Tel Aviv. She has a BA in Race, Class, & Gender Studies and the Politics of Representation from Evergreen College in Olympia, Washington, and an MFA in Media Arts Production from the City University of New York. Over the years, Jones has worked extensively on socially and politically engaged documentaries about Israel/Palestine and has been affiliated with progressive media outlets such as the (anti-)Occupation Club in Tel Aviv, the joint Israeli/Palestinian Alternative Information Center in Jerusalem and the critically acclaimed public TV/radio program Democracy Now! in New York.

Career 
From 1992 until 1998, Jones worked in several positions in the non-profit sector, including as a fundraiser, writer and photo editor at the Alternative Information Center, an NGO that disseminates information on the Palestinian-Israeli conflict, with progressive analysis; as a fundraiser for HILA, a joint Mizrahi-Arab-Ethiopian NGO that advocates for non-discriminatory public education; and as the political projects coordinator for the Jerusalem Link, a joint Israeli-Palestinian women's organization working for social justice and empowerment of women in both societies.

Documentary films 
In 1994, Jones began her career in documentary filmmaking, working as a line producer and assistant director on multiple films, working primarily on films by Duki Dror, among them the award-winning Raging Dove; and films by Simone Bitton, including the film Wall, which won the Special Jury Award at the 2004 Sundance Film Festival, among other international awards.

The first documentary feature directed and co-produced by Jones was 500 Dunam on the Moon in 2002, which tells the story of Ein Hod, a Palestinian village that was captured and depopulated by Israeli forces in the 1948 Arab–Israeli War. The film was screened at international film festivals, including the San Francisco Jewish Film Festival, Human Rights Watch Film Festival and the Austin Film Festival. It won the Jury Award for best documentary at the Festival de Trois Continents, and was broadcast on France 2 television.

Jones' next major effort was of more autobiographical significance. In Gypsy Davy, which premiered at Sundance Film Festival in 2011, she tells the story of how "A white-boy with Alabama roots becomes a Flamenco guitarist in Andalusian boots and fathers five children to five different women along the way," who just happens to be the father who abandoned her in her infancy. In the film, Jones narrates as if she is writing a letter to her elusive father, and gathers his many wives and children to also state their feelings and perceptions of the artist. The film, which was well-received by critics, went on to screen at many international festivals, and won the Jury Award for Best Documentary at the International Women's Film Festival In Rehovot. It was later broadcast on Israel's Channel 8 and on HBO Latin America.

In 2007, Jones released her next film, Ashkenaz. The film deals with public perceptions about Ashkenzi-Mizrahi relations and social status in Israel, highlighting the manner in which the hegemonic group's (Ashkenazim) identity becomes "invisibilized" in favor of being seen as "normal" rather than an ethnicity. The film received positive reviews, was screened at documentary and Jewish film festivals around the world, and was released to cinematheques across Israel, and was also broadcast on Israel's Channel 8. The controversial subject of the film led to special screenings with discussion panels, in which major cultural figures participated, especially from the non-Ashkenzi side of the social map, such as Sami Shalom Chetrit and Jamal Zahalka, who were also featured in the film. The film was also cited in the academic research journal Pe'amim, published by the Ben Zvi Institute for the study of Jewish communities in the East, in an article by Reuven Snir, "Baghdad Yesterday: About History, Identity and Poetry" (in Hebrew: בגדאד, אתמול: על היסטוריה, זהות ושירה).

Advocate, which had its world premiere at Sundance on January 27, 2019, and its Israeli premiere at Docaviv on May 23, 2019, proved to be her most controversial work to date. The film, co-directed and co-produced with Philippe Bellaïche, tells the story of Leah Tsemel, an Israeli human rights lawyer known for representing Palestinian defendants, especially in high-profile terrorism cases. When the film won the Jury Award at Docaviv, which was supported by Mifal HaPayis, a government agency, a storm of right-wing political pressure broke out, demanding that the agency renege on its financial obligation to the festival. When Minister of Culture Miri Regev joined the call to cancel its support, calling the film "anti-Israel", Mifal HaPayis announced it would no longer fund the award. In response, dozens of leading artists, writers, filmmakers, journalists and professional associations slammed the decision as a curbing of free speech, mounted protests, called for boycotts, and published columns and editorials protesting the governmental interference in cultural productions.

The film, which was enthusiastically received by film critics, opened the 2019 Human Rights Watch Film Festival, and plucked top prizes at the Kraków Film Festival, Hong Kong and Thessaloniki festivals. Advocate's Israeli theater premier took place on September 5, 2019, when it opened at cinematheques nationwide.

Due to the public reaction to the film, Jones, who was already a well-known and highly regarded filmmaker in Israel and abroad, a recognized member of several professional guilds, and a Juror for the 2013 Jerusalem Film Festival - quickly became the center of the high-profile media coverage of Advocate, at home and internationally. The film has been called both a symbol and a standard bearer by critics.

Television 
From 2001 to 2002, Jones was an editor and camerawoman for the nationally syndicated US television program, Democracy Now!, hosted by Amy Goodman, working during that time on the transition of the program from radio to television. She produced several documentary programs, including two episodes of the French television series L'Invitation au Voyage, about Palestinian poet Mahmoud Darwish and Israeli novelist Aharon Applefeld, hosted by Laure Adler, and holy land segments of Science of the Bible, for National Geographic in 2005; and in 2004, "Another Israel", a reporting segment for the France 2 program Un Oeil sur le Palenete.

Publishing 
Jones has worked as a translator and editor in the publishing industry, mostly between 2001 and 2006. Among the books she translated are: Self Portrait: Palestinian Women's Art (Lerer, Yael Ed.; 2001, Andalus, Tel Aviv); Breaking Ranks: Refusing to Serve in the West Bank and Gaza Strip (Chacham, Ronit, Ed.; 2002, Other Press, New York); Reporting From Ramallah: An Israeli Journalist (Amira Hass) In An Occupied Land (also edited by Jones; 2003, Semiotext(e), New York); Mother Tongue: A Mizrahi Present That Stirs In The Thickets Of An Arab Past (Nizri, Yigal Ed.; 2005, Babel, Tel Aviv); Cities of Collision: Jerusalem and the Principle of Conflict Urbanism (Misselwitz, Philippe & Rienitis, Tim, Eds.; 2006, Birkhauser Press Basel-Boston-Berlin).

Filmography

Film

Television

Awards 

Note that all awards and nominations for Advocate are shared by Philippe Bellaiche.

References

External links 
 
Interview with Rachel Leah Jones and Leah Tzemel, Democracy Now!, June 14, 2019

1970 births
Living people
Evergreen State College alumni
American documentary film directors
Film directors from California
People from Berkeley, California
City University of New York alumni
Israeli documentary film directors
Israeli women film directors
People from Tel Aviv